This list of Heritage New Zealand-listed places in Buller District contains those buildings and structures that are listed with Heritage New Zealand (formerly known as Historic Places Trust) in Buller District, New Zealand.

Heritage New Zealand is a Crown entity and the national heritage agency. With a head office in Wellington, the Christchurch area office is responsible for the Grey District.

References 

History of the West Coast, New Zealand
Butler